Charles Bradford "Brad" Cooper II (born 1967) is a United States Navy vice admiral who currently serves as commander of United States Naval Forces Central Command, Commander, United States Fifth Fleet and Commander, Combined Maritime Forces. He previously served as Commander, Naval Surface Forces Atlantic and, before that, as the Chief of Legislative Affairs of the United States Navy.

Cooper attended Sidney Lanier High School in Montgomery, Alabama. He is a 1989 graduate of the United States Naval Academy. Cooper later earned a master's degree in strategic intelligence from the National Intelligence University. During his tenure as commander of Naval Forces Korea, Cooper was bestowed the Korean name Goo Tae-il by the ROK-US Alliance Friendship Association in honor of his service to the Korean peninsula.

Awards and decorations

Notes

References

1967 births
Living people
Place of birth missing (living people)
Sidney Lanier High School alumni
United States Naval Academy alumni
National Intelligence University alumni
Recipients of the Legion of Merit
United States Navy admirals
Recipients of the Defense Superior Service Medal
Recipients of the Navy Distinguished Service Medal